Michael J. Wherley (born March 15, 1972 in Waconia, Minnesota) is a 3-time World Champion and 2-time Olympian in the sport of rowing. He started rowing at the University of Minnesota in 1990, before rowing at Penn AC Rowing Association and then the U.S. National Team from 1997 to 2004. Wherley was part of the U.S. Men's 8+ that won three straight World Championships in 1997–1999. He placed 5th in the Men's 4- at the Sydney Olympics in 2000, which was won by Sir Steven Redgrave and the crew from Great Britain. Wherley won two more medals in the U.S. Men's 8+, before ending his National Team career at the Athens Olympics in 2004 with a 10th-place finish in the Men's 4-.  In 2008, Wherley competed in The Boat Race for the  University of Oxford; Oxford was victorious over Cambridge and Wherley was the oldest rower in the history of the event at the time.  Wherley was inducted into the National Rowing Hall of Fame in 2014. He remains committed to the sport of rowing, and is currently President of Penn AC Rowing Association. He lives in Philadelphia with his wife, Janet Distel, and their daughter.

References 
 

1972 births
Living people
American male rowers
People from Waconia, Minnesota
Olympic rowers of the United States
Rowers at the 2000 Summer Olympics
Rowers at the 2004 Summer Olympics
Oxford University Boat Club rowers
World Rowing Championships medalists for the United States